Real Love is the second studio album by English singer-songwriter and actress Lisa Stansfield, released on 11 November 1991, by Arista Records. Stansfield co-wrote all songs with Ian Devaney and Andy Morris, whom also produced the album.

Upon release, Real Love received generally positive reviews from music critics and achieved commercial success. It reached the top-ten in various countries, including number three in the United Kingdom. Five singles were released from the album, including "Change" (number one on the US Dance Club Songs chart) and "All Woman" (number one on the US Hot R&B/Hip-Hop Songs chart).

Real Love was re-released as a deluxe 2 CD + DVD set in the United Kingdom on 10 November 2014 and in Europe on 21 November 2014.

Background
Between her very successful debut album Affection and her next album Real Love, Stansfield recorded "Down in the Depths" which was written by Cole Porter in 1936. This track was included on the AIDS charity compilation Red Hot + Blue, released in September 1990. The music video was also filmed and directed by Philippe Gautier. In 2003, "Down in the Depths" was included on Stansfield's album, Biography: The Greatest Hits. Stansfield recorded the songs for Real Love in 1991.

Content
The album was entirely written by Stansfield, Ian Devaney and Andy Morris, and produced by Devaney and Morris. It includes thirteen songs except for Japan where Real Love was issued with a bonus track, "Whenever You're Gone". The Japanese edition also has different cover art. The LP version of the album does not contain "First Joy", "Tenderly" and "A Little More Love". In North America, Real Love was released with different sequence of the tracks. In 2003, the album was remastered and re-released as limited edition digipak with three bonus songs: "Whenever You're Gone", "Everything Will Get Better" (from the single "All Woman") and  "Change" remixed by Frankie Knuckles.

Real Love was remastered and expanded, and was re-released as a deluxe 2CD + DVD set in November 2014. It was expanded to feature rare tracks and 12" mixes plus videos, live footage and a specially recorded interview with Stansfield. The twenty-eight-page booklet features photos, memorabilia, lyrics and brand new sleeve notes. The set was issued in the United Kingdom on 10 November 2014 and in Europe on 21 November 2014. It was also released as a part of The Collection 1989–2003 at the same time. The 2014 reissue of Real Love includes the previously unreleased track "Time to Make You Mine" (Bomb Squad Remix). Additionally, People Hold On ... The Remix Anthology features another previously unreleased remix of "Time to Make You Mine"; the Sunship Mix.

Singles
The first single, "Change" was released on 7 October 1991. In Europe, it became a hit reaching top ten in Italy, Belgium, Spain, Netherlands and the United Kingdom. In the United States, "Change" peaked at number one on the Hot Dance Club Songs, number twelve on the Hot R&B/Hip-Hop Songs, number thirteen on the Adult Contemporary Singles and number twenty-seven on the Billboard Hot 100. It also reached number ten in Canada. The second single, "All Woman" was issued on 9 December 1991. The song peaked inside top forty in the European countries, including Italy, United Kingdom, Netherlands, Belgium and Sweden. "All Woman" was successful on the Hot R&B/Hip-Hop Songs in the United States and topped this chart for one week. On the Billboard Hot 100, it reached number fifty-six and on the Adult Contemporary Singles, "All Woman peaked at number twenty-one. The single's B-side, "Everything Will Get Better" reached number thirty-six on the Hot Dance Club Songs. The third European single, "Time to Make You Mine" was released on 2 March 1992 and peaked inside top forty in the United Kingdom (number fourteen) and Switzerland (number thirty-three). "Set Your Loving Free" was issued as the fourth and last single in Europe and became another top forty hit, reaching number twenty-eight in the United Kingdom and number thirty-six in the Netherlands. The third US single, "A Little More Love" was released on 30 June 1992 and peaked at number thirty on the Hot R&B/Hip-Hop Songs. Its B-side, "Set Your Loving Free" reached number twenty on the Hot Dance Club Songs. In 2003, "Change", "All Woman", "Time to Make You Mine" and "Set Your Loving Free" were included on Biography: The Greatest Hits.

Critical reception

Real Love received positive reviews from music critics. Alex Henderson from AllMusic wrote that the album contains "definite gems", "including the poignant and heartbreaking ballad 'All Woman,' the spunky 'Soul Deep' and the sleek 'Set Your Loving Free.'" He added that Real Love is "far superior to most '90s R&B" and Stansfield is a "major talent". Dave Obee from Calgary Herald said, "Believe the title. It's telling the truth. [...] This time around, she's singing about love again but, by golly, she sounds like she means it. There's real passion. As if she's actually singing about her own life. And yes, she has a great voice that suits the funky dance music. Really." Marisa Fox from Entertainment Weekly found that with the album, "Stansfield prove[d] she isn't just another soul crooner with robust vocals and an air of longing. The aptly titled Real Love is a collection of steamy love songs, accented with flutes, horns, and sometimes, lush, Barry White-like orchestration. Stansfield has cut out slogans in favor of meaty personal politics, taking a more clinical look at what triggers her emotions. On 'Symptoms of Loneliness and Heartache,' she reaches deep down in her heart (and throat) to tell an ex: 'I don't see emotion or quality of life/Just symptoms of loneliness and heartache.' And yet she isn't afraid to cut loose, as on 'It's Got to Be Real.' Ultimately, Stansfield comes off as a hopeless romantic who has all the strength and determination to convert even the worst cynic." Parry Gettelman from Orlando Sentinel stated that "Stansfield's brand of dance-pop still outclasses most of the genre."

Stephen Holden from Rolling Stone wrote that Stansfield is "one of the first British stars to redo American pop-soul styles of the Seventies. Shaped with the help of her songwriting and producing collaborators Ian Devaney and Andy Morris, her retro disco crossbreeds the harmonic vocabulary of mid-Seventies Philly soul with the lush, cheesy textures of Barry White and his Love Unlimited Orchestra. Up-to-the-minute electronic dance beats make it all sound contemporary. What makes the mix special is Stansfield's wantonly emotive singing, which is "as luscious as melting chocolate." On her second album, her voice is even richer and the arrangements more inventive and far-reaching than on Affection, her 1989 debut. The new album's gem, 'All Woman' is an almost overripe ballad about a long-suffering wife that sounds tailor-made for Gladys Knight, although Knight would have a hard time topping Stansfield's version. Like everything else on the album, from the trancelike disco prayer of the title track to the inspirational lover's promise 'Set Your Loving Free,' Real Love turns the world into a 'gold-and-velvet-trimmed valentine box in which romantic dreams are all that matter.'" According to Q, the album is "excellent" and Musician stated that it is a "knockout" with "shrewd and heartfelt music". The New York Times wrote that Stansfield brings danceable mid-1970s-style pop to a "pinnacle of musical sophistication and emotional heat." Robert Christgau chose "All Woman" as the best track on the album. According to CD Universe, Real Love features a "number of top-notch tunes, most notably the hit singles 'Change' and 'All Woman.' While the former song plays up the energetic, club-oriented aspect of Stansfield's aesthetic, the latter number is a R&B ballad that reinforces the vocalist's reputation as one of England's finest blue-eyed soul acts. The album's true charm, however, lies in its underrated album cuts, particularly the celebratory 'Soul Deep,' which includes funky Stevie Wonder-like keyboard lines, and the emotive string-tinged title track."

Commercial performance

The album was commercially successful and reached top ten in the following European countries: United Kingdom (number three), Netherlands (number five), Germany (number nine) and Belgium (number ten). In other parts of Europe, it peaked inside top forty. Real Love also reached number twenty-five in New Zealand, number thirty-eight in Japan and number forty in Australia. In the United States, it peaked at number six on the Top R&B/Hip-Hop Albums and number forty-three on the Billboard 200. It also reached number thirty-one in Canada. Real Love was certified 2× Platinum in the United Kingdom and Gold in the United States, Canada, Germany and Switzerland.

Track listing

Personnel
Credits taken from AllMusic.

Yak Bondy – keyboards, programming, harmonica
Bobby Boughton – engineer, mixing
Snake Davis – saxophones, flutes, horn arrangements
Ian Devaney – producer, arranger, keyboards, guitars, programming, trombone, engineer, mixing
Andy Gangadeen – drums, rhythm arrangements
Stephen Gibson – trumpet, flugelhorn
Rebecca Gilliver – strings
Gary Grant – trumpets, flugelhorns
Drusilla Harris – strings
Jerry Hey – trumpets, flugelhorns, horn and string arrangements
Dan Higgins – saxophones, flutes
Benedict Holland – strings
Aileen McLaughlin – background vocals
Andy Morris – producer, arranger, keyboards, programming, trumpet, flugelhorn, engineer, mixing
Berend Mulder – strings
Jane Nossek – strings
Tim Parry – executive producer
John Price – strings
Bill Reichenbach Jr. – trombones
Annie Ross – background vocals
Juliet Snell – strings
Snowboy – percussion, rhythm arrangements
Lisa Stansfield – vocals
Jazz Summers – executive producer
Winkie Thin – strings
Richard Thirlwell – strings
Rebecca Thompson – strings
Jenny Turner – strings
Max Vadukul – photography
Simon Vance – strings, string arrangements
Andrew Walton – strings
Marcus Williams – bass
Richard Williamson – strings

Charts

Weekly charts

Year-end charts

Certifications and sales

Release history

References

Lisa Stansfield albums
1991 albums